Odd is the fourth Korean studio album (seventh overall) by South Korean boy band Shinee. It was released digitally and physically on May 18, 2015 under SM Entertainment and distributed by KT Music. The album contains 11 songs, including the title track, "View". The music video for the title track was filmed in Thailand. The repackaged album, Married to the Music, was released on August 3, 2015 with four additional songs.

The album received favorable reviews from music critics, who praised Shinee's experimental and playful sound which results in a "fresh and evolved album", as well as the group's return to their R&B side. The album was commercially successful in South Korea—the title track topped the Gaon Digital Chart, while the album charted at number one on the Gaon Album Chart, selling over 165,000 copies during the first month of release. It also sold over 2,000 copies in the US.

Background and release 
Shinee worked alongside SM Entertainment's creative director Min Hee-jin.

Shinee's fourth full-length album was digitally and physically released on May 18, 2015 and is the group's first Korean release after a two-year hiatus. On May 21, the group began their promotions for the title song "View" on music shows, starting with Mnet's M! Countdown and followed by KBS' Music Bank, MBC's Show! Music Core and SBS' Inkigayo. As part of the promotion, the group members also guested on several variety shows including Hello Counselor, Saturday Night Live Korea and Non-Summit. They also appeared on fellow member Jonghyun's radio show, Blue Night.

Odd contains a total of 11 songs, including songs produced by international producer teams The Stereotypes and the Underdogs, British composing group LDN Noise, G'harah "PK" Degeddingseze, composer Kenzie, and Steven Lee. The title track, "View", is produced by LDN Noise and is an upbeat song of the deep house genre. It has been described as having a "refined and sensual" sound, expressing love's beauty as a "mixture of diverse senses". Shinee member Jonghyun wrote the lyrics to the song. Member Minho stated that he was worried about the new concept since the musical style was different to what the group had done before, which explains the title.

Odd debuted at number nine on Billboards Heatseekers Albums Chart and number one on Billboards World Albums Chart and sold 2,000 copies in the US. The album also stayed in the top 10 of the Billboard World Albums Chart for three consecutive weeks after its release on May 18. The music video for "View" was filmed in different locations in Thailand and was the most watched K-pop music video in the world for the month of May. Following the success of the album, Shinee were also chosen to become the new models of Shilla Duty Free. As of June 2015, the album has sold over 165,000 copies on the Gaon Charts, ranking first for that month.

Repackaging release
The repackaged album Married to the Music included four additional songs: "Married to the Music", "Savior", "Hold You" and "Chocolate". "Married to the Music" is described as funky disco and is the work of LDN Noise, Kenzie, Zak Waters, and Adrian McKinnon. "Savior", produced by Zak Waters and written by Kenzie, is characterized by trendy and sensual lyrics. "Hold You" is a R&B song which was produced by Stereotypes and Deez. "Chocolate", a medium-tempo R&B track written by group member Jonghyun and Yankie, is described as a charming love story that is sweet like chocolate. The choreography of the title song, "Married to the Music," is the work of Greg S. Hwang and Tony Testa.

Jeff Benjamin of Billboard describes the title track as "a journey of different genres, opening with what initially sounds like a "beatbox-heavy, hip-hop sound" before flipping to a "sexy, bouncy electronic beat on the verses until we get to a funk-inspired chorus that mixes in horn blasts, groovy guitar strums and classic boy-band harmonies".

Critical reception 

Melon's pop music critics chose Shinee's Odd as one of the best albums for the first half of 2015, praising the vocal skills of the members and stating: "Shinee made an exemplary display of both 'pleasure of listening and joy of watching' once again."

Odd was also selected as one of MTV IGGY's "25 Best Albums of 2015", praising the "experimenting and playing with old and new sounds, resulting in a fresh and evolved album". The title song, "View", got a positive response, describing it as a great, laid back summer jam even though "the song fools us into thinking it's an uptempo ballad before reaching its techno peak at the chorus."

Jeff Benjamin of Billboard praised the title song, stating, "Despite boasting completely different vibes, 'View' isn't that different from 'Everybody' in that both have the same repetitive chorus structures, but the latter throws piles of electronica into the chorus while 'View' keeps its instrumentation very simple. By going against what's expected, Shinee actually ends up taking more of a risk by doing less and it pays off handsomely." Album track "Odd Eye" also received praise, which is written and composed by member Jonghyun. Benjamin states the group "return to the R&B side of Shinee with feathery vocals, tight harmonies and member Onew's falsetto howls acting a centerpiece to this grooving opener." But he also criticized some of the songs of the album, like "An Ode to You", saying the "unnecessary electric guitar riffs are added to the mix that soils the pure production." "Black Hole" is also criticized, stating, "it's not only the shortest song of the album, but also one of the most forgettable." Overall he gave the album 3.5 stars out of 5. The title song, "View", was also included in Billboards "Top 20 Best K-Pop Songs of 2015".

Odd was also nominated as one of the "albums of glory" by Arena Homme+ magazine. Shinee was the only idol group on the list. Kim Yunha, a music critic of Arena Homme+, writes: "K-pop, captivating the pop genre for years, may seem like it’s on its journey to find the 'real pop' in the music industry that have been defined as either ballads or dance music at a glance. If you agree on this idea, Shinee is definitely a front-runner that leads this movement. Every time, without any fears, they’ve been opening doors for entirely new levels and after having reached the limit of being a human with 'Everybody' what they have arrived to is a very Shinee-ish stateless world of pop. They are still dancing and singing in a place where nobody dares to covet."

Accolades

Track listing 

Notes
 Minho is credited for writing the song's rap.
 Key is credited for writing the song's rap.

Charts

Odd

Weekly charts

Monthly chart

Year-end chart

Married to the Music

Weekly charts

Monthly chart

Year-end chart

Release history

References 

2015 albums
Shinee albums
SM Entertainment albums
Albums produced by the Underdogs (production team)
Genie Music albums
Albums produced by LDN Noise